Thomai Vardali (born 9 January 1995) is a Greek footballer who plays as a forward for A Division club PAOK FC and the Greece women's national team.

References

External links
 ETSU Buccaneers bio

1995 births
Living people
Women's association football forwards
Greek women's footballers
Greece women's international footballers
PAOK FC (women) players
East Tennessee State Buccaneers women's soccer players
Greek expatriate women's footballers
Greek expatriate sportspeople in the United States
Expatriate women's soccer players in the United States
Footballers from Thessaloniki